Harry Hague (9 April 1922 – 1985), was a British Recorder of the Crown Court and a Liberal Party politician. At the 1962 Blackpool North by-election he achieved a 17% swing that was the first step on a course that led to the Night of the Long Knives when Prime Minister Harold Macmillan dismissed one-third of his Cabinet.

Background
Hague was the son of Sir Harry Hague and Lilian Hindle of Stalybridge and Blackpool. He was educated at Arnold School, Blackpool, Manchester University and London University, LLB degree at London. In 1967 he married Vera Smith. They had two step daughters.

Professional career
Before the war Hague worked for the Blackpool Education Department and in a Blackpool bank. He joined the Army in 1941. He was discharged in March 1944, after injury to a leg during an assault course. He was Called to Bar by the Middle Temple in 1946. He worked as a barrister on the Northern Circuit. He was Assistant Recorder of Burnley from 1969 to 1971. He was a Recorder of the Crown Court from 1972 to 1979.

Political career
In the 1940s Hague joined the Liberal party and was a candidate in the Blackpool Municipal Elections. He was Chairman of Blackpool South Liberal Association. He was President of the Lancashire and Cheshire Young Liberal Federation. He became a member of Liberal Party Council. He was Liberal candidate for the new Blackburn East division of Lancashire at the 1950 General Election. Blackburn was unpromising territory for a Liberal and the party had polled poorly there in 1945. 1950 was little different;

He was a member of the Liberal Party National Executive from 1956 to 1959. He was Liberal candidate for one of his hometown seats, the safe Tory Blackpool North division of Lancashire at the 1959 General Election. The Liberals had not run a candidate here since 1945, yet he still managed to poll a respectable vote;

In 1962 his victorious Tory opponent at Blackpool North was given a peerage which meant that a by-election had to take place. The by-election was expected to deliver another easy Tory win but Hague's campaign almost pulled off a surprise victory; 

The following day voters went to the polls in the 1962 Orpington by-election which delivered the Liberals a famous victory. Then followed a string of strong Liberal electoral performances that resulted in 4 months later in Harold Macmillan sacking a third of his cabinet. Hague was once again a member of the Liberal Party National Executive from 1962 to 1964.
He fought Blackpool North for a third time at the 1964 elections. However, since 1962, support for the Tories had rallied and he again finished second;

He did not stand for parliament again.

References

1922 births
1985 deaths
Liberal Party (UK) parliamentary candidates
Alumni of the University of Manchester
Alumni of the University of London